Vikevåg is a village in the large municipality of Stavanger in Rogaland county, Norway.  The village is located on the south side of the island of Rennesøy.  The northern end of the Mastrafjord Tunnel lies at Vikevåg. The tunnel is part of the European route E39 highway.  Hausken Church is located in Vikevåg.

Prior to 2020, the village was the administrative centre of the old Rennesøy municipality.

References

Villages in Rogaland
Stavanger